Niveas is a genus of moths in the family Choreutidae.

Distribution
The genus is known from Kenya, Papua New Guinea and the Solomon Islands.

Species
Niveas agassizi Rota, 2013
Niveas kone Rota, 2013

Etymology
The generic name is derived from Latin niveum (meaning snowy) and refers to the speckles of white-tipped scales on the wings of the type species.

References

Choreutidae